Saint-Laurent-sur-Sèvre (literally Saint-Laurent on Sèvre) is a commune in the Vendée department in the Pays de la Loire region in western France.

Pilgrimage
Some 25,000 visitors per year arrive at the town, for it is the burial place of two well known Roman Catholic figures: Saint Louis de Montfort and
Blessed Marie Louise Trichet. The Basilica of Saint Louis de Montfort at Saint-Laurent-sur-Sèvre is an impressive structure that attracts a good number of pilgrims each year.

On September 19, 1996, Pope John-Paul II visited the town to meditate and pray on the adjacent tombs of Saint Louis and Blessed Marie Louise. Pope John Paul II's strong Marian devotion was highly influenced by the Mariology of Saint Louis de Montfort. According to his Apostolic Letter Rosarium Virginis Mariae, the pontif's personal motto "Totus Tuus" was inspired by St. Louis' doctrine on total consecration to the Virgin Mary.

Claire Ferchaud was born in Saint-Laurent-sur-Sèvre.

See also
Communes of the Vendée department

References

Communes of Vendée